KMHR (950 AM) is a radio station broadcasting a Regional Mexican format. Licensed to Boise, Idaho, United States, the station serves the Boise area. The station is currently owned by Azteca Media, LLC and is branded as La Mejor.

History
The station went on the air in 1961 as KATN. The call sign was KKIC on 1981-10-26. On 1987-06-23, the station changed its call sign to KJHY, on 1988-02-26 to KKIC, on 2003-08-17 to KNJY, and on 2011-08-01 to the current KMHR.

In 2011, coinciding with the launch of KMHR, First Western Inc. acquired K252FA on 98.3 MHz FM from the Calvary Chapel of Twin Falls and began using it to relay KMHR.

Effective April 12, 2018, First Western sold KMHR and K252FA to Azteca Media, LLC for $250,000.

References

External links

FCC History Cards for KMHR

MHR
Radio stations established in 1961
1961 establishments in Idaho